Felicia Sanders (born Felice Schwartz; April 26, 1921 – February 7, 1975) was a singer and musician of traditional pop music.

Early years
Sanders was born in Mount Vernon, New York but was raised in Southern California.   She studied merchandising at the University of Southern California.

Sanders married Michael Snider (who was in the Army), and they had a son, Jefferson.  During World War II Sanders "decided to give singing a try," thinking it was her duty to sing at camps and hospitals.

Career 
In 1950 Sanders sang at Café Gala, a Hollywood nightclub. About this time she recorded some test transcriptions for bandleader Jerry Fielding. She took them to her friend, jazz musician and bandleader Benny Carter, who thought enough of her talent to recommend her to Mitch Miller, Columbia Records' artist and repertory director. She was picked in 1953 by Percy Faith, Columbia's biggest orchestra leader, to perform the vocal on a song he was recording, taken from the film Moulin Rouge—a biographical film about Toulouse-Lautrec.

"The Song from Moulin Rouge" was recorded on January 22, 1953, as the B-side of a recording of "Swedish Rhapsody". It was Sanders' second record, and it was released by Columbia with the credits shown as "Percy Faith and his Orchestra featuring Felicia Sanders." She had been paid only union scale and her name appeared below Faith's in small letters, but the record became a chart-topper. It scored #1 on both the Billboard and Cash Box record charts. The record was to be Sanders' greatest success. Billboard credited the recording as the No. 1 song for 1953.

Just before the record was released Sanders was hired by New York's famous Blue Angel Supper Club, and she played there for a long time, being the first singer to perform the song "In Other Words (Fly Me to the Moon)" — although she did not record it until several other singers had done so.
Sanders recorded "In Other Words" in 1959 at Decca Recording studio; it was backed with "Summer Love" (composed by Victor Young). During the 1960s she sang frequently at The Bon Soir cabaret on West 8th Street.

In 1955, Sanders released her first Columbia album, Felicia Sanders at the Blue Angel.

Miller kept finding other songs to have her sing, but only one other scored among the Top 30: "Blue Star", based on the theme from the NBC-TV drama series, Medic.

Personal life 
Sanders' marriage to Snider ended in divorce. She married musician Irving Joseph. In the mid-1960s, they formed Special Edition Records, with the first release featuring Sanders' singing.

Death
Felicia Sanders died in her Manhattan home on February 7, 1975, from cancer at the age of 53.

References

External links
1953 Time magazine article on Felicia Sanders
1970 Time magazine article on Felicia Sanders

1921 births
1975 deaths
20th-century American singers
20th-century American women singers
Deaths from cancer in New York (state)
Musicians from Mount Vernon, New York
People from Greater Los Angeles
Traditional pop music singers